Vadakkancheri-II is a village in Palakkad district in the state of Kerala, India. It is a part of the Vadakkancheri gram panchayat, along with Vadakkancheri-I.

Demographics
 India census, Vadakkancheri-II had a population of 12,833 with 6,225 males and 6,608 females.

References

Villages in Palakkad district